Pierre Emmanuel Tirard (27 September 1827 – 4 November 1893) was a French politician.

Biography
He was born to French parents in Geneva, Switzerland. After studying in his native town, Tirard became a civil engineer. After five years of government service he resigned to become a jewel merchant. His determined opposition to the empire, culminating in 1869 in a campaign in favour of the radical candidate opposed to Ollivier, was rewarded by his election as mayor of the 11th arrondissement  of Paris and as deputy for the Seine. Nominated a member of the Commune, he protested against the tyranny of the central committee, and escaped from Paris to resume his place among the extreme Left in the National Assembly at Versailles.

In 1876 he was returned for the 1st arrondissement of Paris to the Chamber of Deputies, and was re-elected next year. He specially devoted himself to finance, being for a short time president of the customs commission before his appointment as minister of agriculture and commerce in March 1879 in the Waddington cabinet. He held the same portfolio in the first Freycinet ministry (1879–1880) and in the Jules Ferry cabinet (1880–1881). He was minister of commerce in Freycinet's second cabinet (1882), of finance under E Duclerc (1882–1883), and under A Fallières (1883), retaining the same office in the second Jules Ferry ministry (1883–1885).

When Carnot became president of the Republic in 1887 he asked Tirard to form a ministry. He had to deal with the Wilson scandal which had led to President Jules Grévy's downfall, and with the revisionist agitation of General Boulanger. His refusal to proceed to the revision of the constitution of 1875 led to his defeat on 30 March 1888. He returned to power next year, and decided to bring Boulanger and his chief supporters before the High Court, but the general's flight effectively settled the question. He also arrested Philippe, Duke of Orleans, who had visited France in disguise. He resigned office on 15 March 1890 on the question of the Franco-Turkish commercial treaty. He replaced Maurice Rouvier in Alexandre Ribot's cabinet (1892–1893) as minister of finance, and died in Paris.

Tirard’s 1st Ministry, 12 December 1887 – 3 April 1888
Pierre Tirard – President of the Council and Minister of Finance
Émile Flourens – Minister of Foreign Affairs
François Auguste Logerot – Minister of War
Ferdinand Sarrien – Minister of the Interior
Armand Fallières – Minister of Justice
François de Mahy – Minister of Marine and Colonies
Leopold Faye – Minister of Public Instruction, Fine Arts, and Worship
Jules Viette – Minister of Agriculture
Émile Loubet – Minister of Public Works
Lucien Dautresme – Minister of Commerce and Industry

Changes
5 January 1888 – Jules François Émile Krantz succeeds Mahy as Minister of Marine and Colonies

Tirard’s 2nd Ministry, 22 February 1889 – 17 March 1890
Pierre Tirard – President of the Council and Minister of Commerce and Industry
Eugène Spuller – Minister of Foreign Affairs
Charles de Freycinet – Minister of War
Ernest Constans – Minister of the Interior
Maurice Rouvier – Minister of Finance
François Thévenet – Minister of Justice and Worship
Benjamin Jaurès – Minister of Marine and Colonies.
Armand Fallières – Minister of Public Instruction and Fine Arts
Léopold Faye – Minister of Agriculture
Yves Guyot – Minister of Public Works

Changes
14 March 1889 – Jules François Émile Krantz succeeds Jaurès as Minister of Marine.  Premier Tirard becomes Minister of the Colonies, in addition to Minister of Commerce and Industry.
10 November 1889 – Édouard Barbey succeeds Krantz as Minister of Marine.
1 March 1890 – Léon Bourgeois succeeds Constans as Minister of the Interior

References

Attribution

1827 births
1893 deaths
Politicians from Geneva
Republican Union (France) politicians
Prime Ministers of France
French Ministers of Commerce and Industry
French Ministers of Agriculture and Commerce
French Ministers of Commerce
French Ministers of Finance
Members of the National Assembly (1871)
Members of the 1st Chamber of Deputies of the French Third Republic
Members of the 2nd Chamber of Deputies of the French Third Republic
Members of the 3rd Chamber of Deputies of the French Third Republic
French life senators
Burials at Père Lachaise Cemetery